Anthony William James Baxter is a British documentary director and producer. He is known for his documentary films Eye of the Storm, Flint: Who Can You Trust?, You've Been Trumped and A Dangerous Game.

Career
Baxter started his career as a journalist at Capital Radio in 1989. He later worked as a Producer at BBC Radio 5 Live, the BBC factual television programme Top Gear, and at Independent Television News (ITN). In 2011, he directed his debut feature documentary, You've Been Trumped, which won best environmental film award at the Sedona Film Festival, won the Maysles Brothers Award at the Denver Film Festival and won the Sheffield Green Award at Sheffield DocFest. In 2014, he directed A Dangerous Game, which was nominated for the audience award at the Edinburgh International Film Festival and the Sheffield Green Award at Sheffield DocFest. He directed the sequel to You've Been Trumped, entitled You've Been Trumped Too, released in 2016.

Baxter's 2021 documentary Eye of the Storm, premiered at the Glasgow Film Festival, prior to its broadcast on BBC Two and won the best specialist factual at BAFTA Scotland.

Filmography

Awards and nominations

References

External links
 

British documentary film directors
British film directors
British journalists
Living people
Year of birth missing (living people)